Kaestneria pullata is a species of sheetweb spider in the family Linyphiidae. It is found in North America, Europe, a range from Russia (European to the Far East), China, Mongolia, and Japan.

References

Linyphiidae
Articles created by Qbugbot
Spiders described in 1863